"Taxi Mary" is a pop song written by Jeff Burstin, Joe Camilleri and Tony Faehse and recorded by the Australian musicians Jo Jo Zep (pseudonym of Camilleri) and Jane Clifton (who is uncredited on the song). It was released in September 1982 as the lead single from Zep's seventh studio album, Cha (1982).

Camilleri later said that the song came at a time when "we weren't looking too good on the charts. I needed a hair transplant, I needed some work on my teeth, I needed platform shoes and to put my kids through University".

The song peaked at number 11 on the Kent Music Report in Australia.

Track listing 
7" (Mushroom – K-8818) 
Side A – "Taxi Mary" - 3:56
Side B – "This Is Our Time" - 3:22

Charts

References 

1982 songs
Male–female vocal duets
1982 singles
Mushroom Records singles
Songs written by Joe Camilleri
Jo Jo Zep & The Falcons songs